Ian Craig was selected to give the 67th 2018 Bernard Price Memorial Lecture from the South African Institute of Electrical Engineers (SAIEE). The title of his lecture was ‘Automatic Control: The Hidden Technology that Modern Society Cannot Live Without.'

Academia 
Craig has a BEng degree in Electronic Engineering from the University of Pretoria an S.M. degree from the Massachusetts Institute of Technology, an MBA and Ph.D and from the University of the Witwatersrand. In 1995 he became a professor at the University of Pretoria in its Department of Electrical, Electronic and Computer Engineering, as well as head of the Control Systems Group.

Publications 
In 2005 Craig became editor-in-chief of Control Engineering Practice. He has published over 150 papers.

Board memberships 
In 2011 Craig was appointed President of the International Federation of Automatic Control (IFAC), a position he held until 2014. Three years later he became IFAC Advisor and then chair of its Foundation Board and Publications Committee. Craig is a Fellow of the South African Institute of Electrical Engineers and the Society for Automation, Instrumentation, Measurement and Control (SAIMC).

Acclaim 
The awards and recognition Craig has received include the following:

 2006: elected Fellow of the South African Academy of Engineering
 2008: received the IFAC Outstanding Service Award
 2014: President's Award recipient from the South African Institute of Electrical Engineers (SAIEE)
 Exceptional  Academic Achiever Award from the University of Pretoria (three times)
 He is rated as an internationally acclaimed researcher by the South African National Research Foundation.

References 

South African engineers
University of Pretoria alumni
Year of birth missing (living people)
Living people
Massachusetts Institute of Technology alumni
University of the Witwatersrand alumni